Jorge Brito may refer to:

 Jorge Brito (baseball) (born 1966), former Major League Baseball catcher
 Jorge Brito (volleyball) (born 1966), Brazilian retired volleyball player
 Jorge Horacio Brito (1952–2020), Argentine banker and businessman
 Jorge Brito (visual artist) (1925–1996), Argentine artist